Pentacerotidae or armourheads are a small family of fishes in the order Perciformes. They are native to the Indian Ocean, western and central Pacific, and southwestern Atlantic. They are generally found at rocky reefs below normal scuba diving depths, although several species occur in low densities at shallower depths.

Their name, from Greek pente meaning "five" and keras meaning "horn", refers to the prominent, sharp spines in their dorsal fins (though these do not number five in all species). Many species have distinct dark-and-light-striped bodies, while others are overall dusky-silvery.

Timeline

Genera
The following genera are classified within the family into two subfamilies:

 Subfamily Histiopterinae Bleeker, 1876
 Evistias Jordan, 1907
 Histiopterus Temminck & Schlegel, 1844
 Parazanclistius Hardy, 1983
 Paristiopterus Bleeker, 1876 
 Pentaceropsis Steindachner, 1883
 Zanclistius Jordan, 1907
 Subfamily Pentacerotinae Bleeker, 1859
 Pentaceros Cuvier, 1829

References

External links 
 Smith, J.L.B. 1964. Fishes of the family Pentacerotidae. Ichthyological Bulletin; No. 29. Department of Ichthyology, Rhodes University, Grahamstown, South Africa.

 
Perciformes families